East Washington is a borough of Washington County, Pennsylvania, United States. The population was 1,858 at the 2020 census.

History
The East Washington Historic District was listed on the National Register of Historic Places in 1984.

Geography
East Washington is located at  (40.173799, -80.233945).

Demographics

At the 2000 census there were 1,930 people, 903 households, and 492 families living in the borough. The population density was 4,225.3 people per square mile (1,620.0/km2). There were 983 housing units at an average density of 2,152.1 per square mile (825.1/km2).  The racial makeup of the borough was 94.04% White, 4.25% African American, 0.21% Native American, 0.36% Asian, 0.10% Pacific Islander, 0.05% from other races, and 0.98% from two or more races. Hispanic or Latino of any race were 0.21%.

There were 903 households, 23.4% had children under the age of 18 living with them, 42.9% were married couples living together, 9.1% had a female householder with no husband present, and 45.5% were non-family households. 38.2% of households were one person and 12.2% were one person aged 65 or older. The average household size was 2.14 and the average family size was 2.82.

The age distribution was 20.3% under the age of 18, 10.1% from 18 to 24, 28.9% from 25 to 44, 25.7% from 45 to 64, and 15.0% 65 or older. The median age was 40 years. For every 100 females, there were 90.7 males. For every 100 females age 18 and over, there were 84.4 males.

The median household income was $41,319 and the median family income  was $65,625. Males had a median income of $47,266 versus $27,414 for females. The per capita income for the borough was $32,852. About 5.4% of families and 9.8% of the population were below the poverty line, including 8.4% of those under age 18 and none of those age 65 or over.

References

External links
East Washington borough website

 
Boroughs in Washington County, Pennsylvania
Populated places established in 1892
Pittsburgh metropolitan area
1892 establishments in Pennsylvania